This article displays the women singles qualifying draw of the 2011 Toray Pan Pacific Open.

Players

Seeds

Qualifiers

Qualifying draw

First qualifier

Second qualifier

Third qualifier

Fourth qualifier

Fifth qualifier

Sixth qualifier

Seventh qualifier

Eighth qualifier

References
 Qualifying Draw

Toray Pan Pacific Open - Qualifying
2011 qualifying
Singles qualifying